A youth village (Kfar No'ar) is a boarding school model first developed in Mandatory Palestine in the 1930s to care for groups of children and teenagers fleeing the Nazis. Henrietta Szold and Recha Freier were the pioneers in this sphere, known as youth aliyah, creating an educational facility that was a cross between a European boarding school and a kibbutz.

History

The first youth village was Mikve Israel. In the 1940s and 1950s, a period of mass immigration to Israel, youth villages were an important tool in immigrant absorption. Youth villages were established during this period by  the Jewish Agency, WIZO, and Na'amat. After the establishment of Israel, the Israeli Ministry of Education took over the administration of these institutions, but not their ownership.

The Hadassah Neurim Youth Village, founded by Akiva Yishai, was the first vocational school for Youth Aliyah children, who had been offered only agricultural training until then.

From the 1960s to the 1980s, young people from broken or troubled homes were sent to youth villages. Today some of the villages have closed, but many continue to provide an educational framework for immigrant youth. Others have introduced programs for gifted students from underprivileged neighborhoods, exchange programs for overseas high school students and vocational training facilities. Some function as ordinary high schools and accept non-residential students.

In 2007, Yemin Orde Youth Village, established in the early 1950s on Mount Carmel, had a student population consisting of youngsters from all over the world, including Muslim refugees from Darfur. The village provides a safe haven for destitute children aged 5–19. A youth village patterned after the Israeli model is now being established in Rwanda.

Educational strategy
Residential education is believed to have special value for the two major population targets of Youth Aliyah: immigrant youth and young people from deprived social groups. It creates a strong, influential environment that neutralizes the negative influence of an underprivileged neighborhood, promotes social integration, and provides a broad range of extracurricular activities that may not be available in the home setting.

In 1996, there were 60 youth villages in Israel with a student population of 18,000.

A police studies track was established in 2004 at the Kanot Youth Village, and is now being offered at Nir Ha'emek Youth Village and Hodayot Youth Village. It has been shown that young people with low self-esteem thrive in such programs. Eighteen out of the 20 students at Kanot who studied in the police studies track, which includes criminology, sociology and horseback riding, graduated with a matriculation certificate.

Youth villages in Israel

Adanim
Ahava
Alonei Yitzhak
Aluma
Ayanot
Beit Apple
Ben Shemen
Eshel HaNasi
Givat Washington
Hadassah Neurim
 Hadassim
HaKfar HaYarok

Hodayot 
Havat HaNoar HaTzioni (Israel Goldstein Youth Village)
Kannot
Kedma
Kfar Batia
Kfar HaNoar HaDati
Kfar Silver
Kiryat Ye'arim
Magdiel
Manof
Meir Shfeya
Mevo'ot Yam

Mosenson
Neve Amiel
Neve Galim
Neve Hadassah
Nitzana
Nitzanim (closed in 1990)
Ramat Hadassah
Yohana Jabotinsky
Yemin Orde

See also
Hakhshara
 Gar'in
Kibbutz volunteers
Kibbutz communal child rearing and collective education

References

External links
Youth Villages - The Jewish Agency
In pictures: Israeli youth village - BBC News

Aliyah

Israeli culture
Education in Israel
Living arrangements
Children in the Holocaust
Child refugees
Refugees in Israel